Breg ob Bistrici is a settlement in the Municipality of Tržič in the Upper Carniola region of Slovenia.

Name
Breg ob Bistrici was attested in historical sources as Rain in 1498. The name of the settlement was changed from Breg to Breg ob Bistrici in 1953.

References

External links

Breg ob Bistrici at Geopedia

Populated places in the Municipality of Tržič